Purey-Cust Lodge is an historic building in the English city of York, North Yorkshire. Now  Grade II listed, it dates to 1845. Prior to this date, it was the stone yard for York Minster. 

The building is named for Arthur Purey-Cust, who served as Dean of York from 1880 to 1916.

Its southern wall makes up part of the western end of Precentor's Court, a mediaeval cul-de-sac. At the eastern end of that street is the gate to and from the former gardens of the lodge. The gate used to open onto the Minster stoneyard, in the shadow of York Minster.

History
In 1914, two years before his death, Purey-Cust funded the establishment of the Purey-Cust Nursing Home in the lodge, with its aim being to provide low-cost healthcare to those who could not afford such treatment at the normal rate.

After around three decades of success, the introduction of the National Health Service in 1948 made the nursing home's existence redundant.

In 1968, an agreement was reached with Nuffield Hospitals whereby, in return for a long lease on the property, Nuffield would fund a major refurbishment to the buildings, with the plan to use them as a private hospital.

After two decades, it was decided that Purey-Cust Lodge could no longer meet the requirements of a modern hospital. After Nuffield moved out, the buildings lay empty.

The Purey-Cust trustees sold the buildings in 2013 to a private developer. They were turned into high-end residential accommodation.

See also
Purey-Cust Lodge boundary wall

References

Houses in North Yorkshire
1845 establishments in England
Grade II listed buildings in York
Grade II listed houses
Defunct hospitals in England